The sixteenth season of the American television series Whose Line Is It Anyway? premiered on The CW on March 30, 2020, and concluded on November 16, 2020.

Cast

Recurring  
 Gary Anthony Williams (five episodes)
 Jeff Davis (five episodes)
 Greg Proops (three episodes)
 Chip Esten (three episodes)
 Jonathan Mangum (three episodes)
 Brad Sherwood (one episode)

Episodes 

"Winner(s)" of each episode as chosen by host Aisha Tyler are highlighted in italics. The winner(s) perform a sketch during the credit roll, just like in the original UK series.

References

External links
Whose Line Is It Anyway? (U.S.) (a Titles & Air Dates Guide)
Mark's guide to Whose Line is it Anyway? - Episode Guide

Whose Line Is It Anyway?
2020 American television seasons